Gramaglia is an Italian surname. Notable people with the surname include:

Bruno Gramaglia (1919–2005), Italian footballer
Marie-Pierre Gramaglia, Monagesque politician
Mariella Gramaglia (1949–2014), Italian politician and feminist

Italian-language surnames